Baojing County is a county of Hunan Province, China, it is under the administration of Xiangxi Autonomous Prefecture.

Located on the western margin of the province and the west central Xiangxi, it is immediately adjacent to the southeast of Chongqing Municipality. The county is bordered to the northwest by Longshan County, to the northeast by Yongshun County, to the east by Guzhang County, to the south by Jishou City and Huayuan County, to the west by Xiushan County of Chongqing. The county has 10 towns and 2 townships under its jurisdiction, the county seat is Qianling.

Climate

References
www.xzqh.org

External links 

 
County-level divisions of Hunan
Xiangxi Tujia and Miao Autonomous Prefecture